Road roller speed skating at the 2012 Asian Beach Games was held from 17 June to 18 June 2012 in Fengxiang Beach, Haiyang, China.

Medalists

Men

Women

Medal table

Results

Men

200 m time trial
17 June

500 m sprint
18 June

Heats

Semifinals

Final

10000 m points
17 June

20000 m elimination
18 June

Women

200 m time trial
17 June

500 m sprint
18 June

Heats

Semifinals

Final

10000 m points
17 June

20000 m elimination
18 June

References

Results Book

External links
 Official Website

2012 Asian Beach Games events
2012 Asian Beach Games
2012 in roller sports